Damon's Law (also known as The Rutherford County Line) is a 1987 American action film that follows the events and criminal cases that Sheriff Damon Huskey encounters while working for Rutherford County, North Carolina.  Based on actual events, the film characterizes how Huskey, played by Earl Owensby, handles each case as well in some instances how they change his life forever.

Plot
Set in Rutherford County, North Carolina, Damon's Law tells the story of Sheriff Damon Huskey's experiences as Sheriff of Rutherford County.  He is portrayed as a man who is admired by his town and who is well respected. Huskey, played by Earl Owensby (who also produced the film), faces instances where he calms an uncontrollable prisoner, approaches an armed suspect, without his own weapon drawn, as well as an animal cruelty report that in turn ends with a child abuse case.  Sheriff Huskey encounters previously released prisoners, and also juggles his career and relationship with his family.  As he protects the lives of his county citizens, maintains control and justice of suspects and criminals, Huskey also works in close relation to his brother, Deputy Roy Huskey (Terry Loughlin).  Together with the other deputies, the Rutherford County men keep violence and criminal acts to a minimum. However, on the evening of May 31, 1979, an event takes place that changes Huskey's life personally and professionally, as well as all who live in Rutherford County forever.

On this night, the same as a local high school graduation, a call is placed to the Sheriffs Department by Charlotte Hutchins, the daughter of a well-known criminal in Rutherford County, James W. Hutchins (Dean Whitworth).  She called because of a dispute she had with her father.  Roy Huskey, and fellow deputy Owen Messersmith (Gene Kusterer) take the call. Hutchins is known throughout the community as a harmful and abusive man, and knowing this, Huskey and Messersmith head straight to the Hutchins residence.  Upon arrival, James W. Hutchins guns down Deputy Huskey and Deputy Messersmith.  He then leaves in his vehicle traveling away from his residence.  He comes in contact with RL "Pete" Peterson (Steve Howard) while driving.  Hutchins proceeds to gun him down as well on the side of the road, making Peterson his third victim.  Hutchins then leaves his car and tries to hide in the woods. Damon soon receives word of the events and begins his own search for Hutchins.  The following morning, with 200 men closing in on the woods where Hutchins ran, he surrenders.  He is arrested and tried for murder.  He is sentenced to death and chooses lethal injection.

Cast
Earl Owensby as Damon Huskey
Terry Loughlin as Roy Huskey
Marliyn Carter as Marjorie
Rodney Orton as Junior
Gene Kusterer as Owen Messersmith
Dean Whitworth as James W. Hutchins
CW Casey Jr. as Lawrence
Steve Howard as RL "Pete" Peterson
Barbara Hird as Hutchins' Wife
Steve Saliby as Hutchins' son
Heather Simmons as Hutchins' daughter

Filming
Filmed on location in Rutherford County, North Carolina, and the Earl Owensby Studios, the largest independent studio in the southeast, located in Shelby, North Carolina.

References

External links

1987 films
1987 action films
American action films
Action films based on actual events
Films set in North Carolina
Films shot in North Carolina
1980s English-language films
1980s American films